The Renault G-Type was a family of naturally aspirated and turbocharged straight-four indirect injection and common rail injection diesel engines. They feature an iron block and aluminum head. The engines were in production for nearly two decades, with improvements in power and torque output and fuel efficiency.

Summary

GxT
Applications:
 G8T
 1996–2000 Renault Safrane
 1994–2001 Renault Laguna I
 1996–2001 Renault Espace III
 G9T
 2001– Renault Espace IV
 2001–2009 Renault Vel Satis
 2001–2003 Renault Avantime
 2002–2006 Renault Laguna II
 1999–2003 Renault Master II/Nissan Interstar/Opel Movano I/Vauxhall Movano I

GxU
Applications:
 G9U
 1999–2003 Renault Master II/Nissan Interstar/Opel Movano I/Vauxhall Movano I
 2001–2011 Renault Trafic II/Nissan Primastar/Opel Vivaro/Vauxhall Vivaro

See also
List of Renault engines

References

G
Diesel engines by model
Straight-four engines